Jóhann Haraldsson (born 7 September 1979) is an Icelandic alpine skier. He competed in two events at the 2002 Winter Olympics.

References

1979 births
Living people
Jóhann Haraldsson
Jóhann Haraldsson
Alpine skiers at the 2002 Winter Olympics
Jóhann Haraldsson
21st-century Icelandic people